The Mahak Society to Support Children with Cancer is a non-governmental organisation in Tehran dedicated to helping Iranian children with cancer.  It runs an 18000 sq m hospital in the north of Tehran.

Foundation of MAHAK 
The organisation was founded in 1991 by Saideh Ghods.  She had experienced having a child with cancer and had witnessed first hand the difficulties faced by her child, and pledged that she would set up a center that would act as a sanctuary for children and their families in a similar situation.  With the assistance of the same friends and relatives who had helped her through her own ordeal, a board of governors was selected and the “MAHAK Society to Support Children with Cancer” was set up as a non-profit, non-governmental Organization.  MAHAK has been active from that day in helping children with cancer and their families and has grown beyond anyone’s expectations.   MAHAK is funded entirely by donations and has supported 11,505 children over the past 17 years.

MAHAK hospital and rehabilitation centre 

 In 2003, MAHAK’s Hospital and Rehabilitation center in Darabad was completed. The center is situated in Tehran’s North Eastern hills and comprises an 18000 square meters building equipped to accommodate up to 120 children, each accompanied by a member of their family. The center houses diagnostic and treatment wards of the highest standards, on a par with those seen anywhere else.
Within the center, there are other facilities offered such as a clinic, a chemotherapy laboratory, radiotherapy section, physiotherapy ward, water therapy section, operation rooms, MRI and CT Scan, Radiology, ICU, library, children's playroom, restaurant, amphitheater and a shopping center.

Operation 

The wards were equipped and began operation in August 2003, when the first patient was admitted.
The two rehabilitation wards are fully functional and are laid out over two floors, with 15 rooms on the first floor for children accompanied by a female member of their immediate family and with another 15 on the second floor for those children who need to be accompanied by a male family member.  There is also a playroom provided for the children, a sitting area for the families and a kitchenette.
Currently, these wards are run by 14 nursing graduates in three shifts around the clock. Two social workers offer their services in two shifts of morning and afternoon and two psychiatrists are available in the afternoon shifts.  In the afternoons a number of volunteers visit the ward to play with the children.
The Society’s team of social workers is fully active in children’s oncology wards in nine hospitals throughout Tehran, where they provide children and their parents with medical treatment and support.  
MAHAK pays all related expenses including X-rays, test, chemotherapy, radiation therapy, food, clothing and all accommodation during their treatment.  Since 60% of the children come to Tehran from the provinces, the Social Work Department arranges for their transfer by ambulance or plane.
MAHAK has been officially recognized by UNHCR as the organization which helps refugee children (Afghan and Iraqi) with cancer both in and out of refugee camps.

Awards 

In 2007, the organisation was presented with the Swiss SGS NGO Benchmarking award for the best and most transparent NGO in the Middle East.

Saideh Ghods received the 2008 IDB prize from the Islamic Development Bank for her work with Mahak

See also
Healthcare in Iran

External links
MAHAK-The society to support Children suffering from Cancer

References

 Charities based in Iran
Medical and health organisations based in Iran